Parigi is a village in Sri Sathya Sai district in the state of Andhra Pradesh in India.

Demographics 
According to Indian census, 2001, the demographic details of Parigi mandal is as follows:
Total Population: 	52,852	in 11,187 Households
Male Population: 	27,287	and Female Population: 	25,565
Children Under 6-years of age: 7,339	(Boys – 3,816 and Girls – 3,523)
Total Literates: 	25,650

Geography 

Parigi is a Mandal in Andhra Pradesh and is the headquarters for a few villages around it. Parigi cheruvu (an irrigation tank) is one of the biggest irrigation tanks in the Sri Sathya Sai district.

Research is being done to know historical significance by reading ancient inscriptions found surroundings of parigi village near pannadamma temple of parigi village, and a copper plate document of Adhembhatta a purohit of Penukonda. Those three copper plates are now in Chennai Museum. According to the research, The inscription is in Sanskrit, the script employed being old Telugu- Kannada. The inscription translated to English is as follows "The Western Ganga King Madhava Mahadhiraja II, alias Simhavarman, gave sixty-five paddy fields, sowable with twenty five khandukas of paddy, below the big tank of Paruvi(old name of Parigi 200AD-1400AD) in "Paruvi Vishaya", to a Brahman named Kumarasarma of the vatsa gotra. The grant was made on the full-moon day in the month of Chaitra (lunar). No further deailts regarding the date are given. This Madhava Mahadhiraja is stated to have been installed on the throne, by the Pallava King Skandavarma Maharaja and Aryavarman, father of Madhava, was installed on the throne, by Simhavarma Maharaja, lord of the Pallava family. These plates are very important as there is mention of two contemporaneous Pallava Kings. Skandavarman appears to have been the son of Simhavarman and is supposed to have ruled during latter part of the 5th Century AD. The plates must therefore have been issued at the beginning of the 6th Century AD.

Panchayats 
The following is the list of village panchayats in Parigi mandal: Beechiganipalli, Honnampalli, Kodigenahalli, Moda, P.Narasapuram, Parigi, Pydeti, Sasanakota, Seegipalli, Sirekolam(Dhanapuram), 	Srirangarajupalli, Utakur, Vittapalli Yerragunta and Boreddipalli

Temples 
There are a few Hindu temples in and around Parigi and a couple of them are believed to have been built between 200-400 years ago as per local records and anecdotes. These are the:

Sri Venkateshwara Swamy Temple

Sri Anjaneya Swamy Temple

The other Temples are:

Devi Panadamma Temple - Grama Devatha

Sri Subramanya Temple

Sri RamaLingeshwara Temple

References 

Villages in Sri Sathya Sai district
Mandal headquarters in Sri Sathya Sai district